Below are the rosters for the 2008 Toulon Tournament. The given age and club affiliation were current as of the start of the tournament.

Those marked in bold have now been capped at full international level.

Group A

Head coach: Marcelo Bielsa

Head coach: Yasuharu Sorimachi

Head coach: Hans Schrijver

Head coach: Jean Gallice

Group B

Head coach: Gérard Gili

Head coach: Pierluigi Casiraghi

Head coach: Ümit Davala

Head coach: Peter Nowak

Footnotes

Squads
Toulon Tournament squads